Ola Skarholt (30 November 1939 – 18 June 2017), was a Norwegian orienteering competitor. He became Relay World Champion in 1970 as a member of the Norwegian winning team, which also consisted of Stig Berge, Per Fosser and Åge Hadler. Skarholt placed fourth in the individual contest.

He also won bronze medals in the relay in the 1966 and 1968 World Orienteering Championships.

Skarholt represented the clubs SK Freidig and IL i BUL. His results at the  include an individual gold medal in 1965.

Skarholt was educated at the Norwegian Institute of Technology, and worked as engineer in the electric power industry. His last job before retirement was a fourteen-year stint as managing director of Lier Electricity Works. He died in Asker on 18 June 2017, 77 years old.

References

1939 births
2017 deaths
Norwegian orienteers
Male orienteers
Foot orienteers
World Orienteering Championships medalists
People from Asker
Norwegian Institute of Technology alumni
Norwegian engineers
Sportspeople from Viken (county)
20th-century Norwegian people
21st-century Norwegian people